Although a relatively small territory, Albania has extensive lowlands, plains, hills, low and high mountains, many valleys, bays, caves and deep canyons. Below is a list of bays in the country:

List of bays in Albania

See also  

 Protected areas of Albania
 Geography of Albania
 Climate of Albania
 Biodiversity of Albania

References 

 

Bays
Landforms of Albania
Albania